Kim Bong-yu (born 16 June 1967) is a South Korean middle-distance runner. He competed in the men's 1500 metres at the 1992 Summer Olympics. He holds the South Korean national record for the indoor 1500 metres with his best of 3:47.95 minutes. He was the bronze medalist at the 1993 East Asian Games behind teammate Kim Soon-hyung and China's Lin Jun.

He was the 1990 Asian Games gold medallist in the 800 m and a silver medalist in the 1500 m. At the 1991 Asian Athletics Championships he was the 1500 m silver medallist behind Mohamed Suleiman.

Notes
Some English-language sources, such as GBR Athletics, erroneously state that Kim Bok-joo was winner of the 1990 Asian Games men's 800 m and the 1500 m silver medallist, as well as the 1991 Asian Championships runner-up. Contemporary English and Korean sources indicate it was his similarly-named teammate Kim Bong-yu who achieved these feats.

References

1967 births
Living people
South Korean male middle-distance runners
Olympic athletes of South Korea
Athletes (track and field) at the 1992 Summer Olympics
Asian Games gold medalists for South Korea
Asian Games silver medalists for South Korea
Medalists at the 1990 Asian Games
Athletes (track and field) at the 1990 Asian Games
Sportspeople from Gangwon Province, South Korea
Asian Games medalists in athletics (track and field)